Chester TMD is a traction maintenance depot located in Chester, Cheshire, England. The depot is situated to the north of Chester railway station, and is located adjacent to the Wirral Line. The depot is currently used as CAF's Chester Traincare Centre, having transerred from Alstom in June 2022.

History
In 1987 the depot had an allocation of Class 08s and DMUs, and was a stabling point for Class 31s and Class 47s. The DMUs allocated included Classes 100, 101, 108, 116 and 120.

Allocation 
As of 2016, the depot's allocation consists of Transport for Wales Class 150 Sprinters, Class 158 Express Sprinters and Class 175s.

References

Sources

Railway depots in England
Rail transport in Cheshire